An Eye for an Eye is the third album by the RBL Posse. It was released on September 30, 1997 for Big Beat Records, distributed by Atlantic Records and featured production from Rick Rock, Black C, Mike Caren, Cellski, Shannon Lacy, The Enhancer, Stan Keith, Michael Mosley, Femi Ojetunde, TC, Maurice Thompson and Jay Williams. An Eye for an Eye was RBL Posse's most successful album, peaking at #70 on the Billboard 200 and #14 on the Top R&B/Hip-Hop Albums, as well as featuring the single "How We Comin'", which peaked at #22 on the Hot Rap Singles and #90 on the Hot R&B/Hip-Hop Singles & Tracks. This is also the group's first ever album to not feature Mr. Cee, as he was fatally shot on New Year's Day 1996.

Track listing
"The Individual"- 5:51 
"How We Comin'" (Southern Fried Mix)- 4:50 (featuring Mystikal, Big Lurch)
"I Time 4 the Homies"- 3:54 
"More Game"- 4:55 (featuring Richie Rich)
"Straight Lacin'"- 5:02 
"Gone Away"- 4:02 
"So Tuff"- 2:00 (featuring Herm)
"An Eye for an Eye"- 5:13 
"Concrete Jungle"- 4:07 
"How We Comin'" (West Side Mix)- 4:11 (featuring Mystikal, Big Lurch)
"You Can't Hang"- 3:40 
"Gotta Git Mine"- 5:45 (featuring MC Eiht & Tela)
"Strictly This Game"- 4:55 
"'Til the End"- 5:35 (featuring The P-O-S-S-E)

References

RBL Posse albums
1997 albums